Carreras may refer to:

Places
 Carreras, Durango, Mexico
 Carreras, Santa Fe, Argentina
 Carreras, Añasco, Puerto Rico, a barrio
 Carreras, Arecibo, Puerto Rico, a barrio

Other uses
 Carreras (surname)
 Carreras Tobacco Company and its factory, now known as Greater London House

See also 
 Carrera (disambiguation)